The Philharmonic Society of Corfu (Philharmonice Ɛtaerɛia Cɛrcyras), or Old Philharmonic (Παλαιά Φιλαρμονική) -to be distinguished from the other 17 bands on the island-, is a widely known community music band in Corfu, Greece.

When it was founded in 1840, its initial scope was to become the first Greek music academy organised on European prototypes. Its first Artistic Director was Nikolaos Halikiopoulos Mantzaros, who retained this office until his death in 1872. The Philharmonic (PSC) had a fully organised programme of tuition both in music theory and practice. Its students, who for the first time in modern Hellenic history could learn music regardless of their social class, had the opportunity to be taught by professional musicians and teachers basic music theory, harmony, counterpoint, instrumentation, composition, as well as piano, vocal music, string and wind instruments.

History

The tuition of the latter category found its artistic expression through the wind band of the philharmonic, an ensemble, which became very popular by developing into an integral part of public and religious festivities. Nonetheless, the popularity of the band (which was the fourth civilian band of the Ionian Islands after those of Zante (1816), Argostoli (1836) and Lixouri (1838) in Kefalonia) was so strong, that in the end in the public opinion of Corfu 'band' became synonymous to the 'philharmonic'. This misunderstanding, however, became gradually a reality, especially after the Second World War, mainly because of the financial problems that a non-governmental institution like PSC came across. as well as a result of the shortage of professional teachers.

Nonetheless, it was only in 1907, as well as during the 1930s when the symphonic orchestra of the society performed in the Municipal Theatre of Corfu, to much critical acclaim. The symphonic orchestra of the Philharmonic made sporadic appearances until the early postwar years. Since 2003 the orchestra has again commenced its activities (as a result of the re-organization of the tuition of the string instruments within the Society).

In 1979 Maria Desylla-Kapodistria, former mayor of Corfu and the first female mayor in Greece, bequeathed the Kapodistrias summer home under contract No. 4541/3.11.1979 to the Reading Society of Corfu, the Philharmonic Society of Corfu and the Society of Corfiote Studies for the purpose of converting it to a museum dedicated to the memory of Ioannis Kapodistrias. The Kapodistrias Museum, under the stewardship of the three societies, was formally inaugurated in 1981.

Music Museum "Nikolaos Chalikiopoulos Mantzaros"

The Museum of the Corfu Philharmonic Society, which occupies the first floor of the Society's building (Nikiforou Theotoki 10), opened for the public on September 18, 2010. The Museum attempts to present in brief the history of the institution after almost two centuries of incessant activity (which coincides with some of the most dramatic periods of modern history). Moreover, the Museum honours Nikolaos Halikiopoulos Mantzaros (1795–1872), the Society's first artistic director (1841–1872), composer –among others– of the Greek national anthem, well-known music teacher and contrapuntist, as well as inspirer of a whole generation of composers that shaped the music of Ionian Islands, and not only, during the 19th century.

The Museum of the Corfu Philharmonic Society «Nikolaos Halikiopoulos Mantzaros» consists of five thematic sections, which present its activities and history:
 Foundation, Administration, Organization: Features historical documents related to the Society's early days and organization.
Educational activities: Presents documents and artifacts related to the music pedagogy within the limits of the Society.
The concerts: The Philharmonic as a concert society for vocal and orchestral music.
The wind band: Documents, scores, instruments and artifacts related to the repertory and the activities of the Society's wind band.
The people and their work: Important composers and teachers, who related themselves through their presence and their works with the history of the Society, as well as with the development of art music in 19th-century Greece. Scores by Spyridon Samaras (Spiro Samara), Pavlos Carrer (Paolo Carrer), the Liberali brothers, Spyridon Xyndas, Domenikos Padovanis, Dionissios Rodotheatos, Alexander Grek, Napoleon Lambelet, Andreas Seiler, as well as women composers from Ionian Islands are exhibited in this section.

The Museum also organizes an annual circle of musicological lectures and has initiated a series of musicological publications. It is open Monday to Saturday from 09.30 until 13.30. The entrance is free.

See also 
 List of music museums

References
Kostas Kardamis, “Corfu Philharmonic Society: An overview of its history”, in Six Essays for the Corfu Philharmonic Society (Publications of the Museum of Music “Nikolaos Halikiopoulos Mantzaros, vol. 1) (Corfu: Corfu Philharmonic Society, 2010), 13–36
Spyridon Motsenigos, Neoelliniki moussiki [Modern Greek Music] (Athens, 1958)

External links
Philharmonic Society of Corfu
Museum of the Philharmonic Society of Corfu

Corfu (city)
Performing arts museums
Music museums
Museums in Corfu
1840 establishments in Greece
Marching bands
Music organizations based in Greece
Culture of Corfu